Andijan State Medical Institute was founded in 1955 in one of the ancient cities of Fergana valley. At present, the Institute is one of the leading institutes in the Republic of Uzbekistan. The scientific potential of the institute is growing day by day.

Overview
Over the years of independence, the institute has trained more than 13000 physicians (including 800 clinical interns, 1116 masters, 200 postgraduates and 20 doctoral students) in various directions.

870 staff work at the institute at present, including 525 professorial-teaching staff in 55 departments, 34 of them are Doctors of science and 132 candidates of science. 4 staff members of the professorial-teaching staff of the institute are Honoured Workers of Science of the Republic of Uzbekistan, 3 – are members of New-York and 2 – members of Russian Academy of Pedagogical Science.

The institute has been training medical staff on the following faculties and directions: Therapeutic, Pediatric, Dentistry, Professional Education, Preventive Medicine, Pharmacy, High Nursing Affair and Physicians’ Advanced Training. At present 3110 students have been studying at the institute (1331 at the Therapeutic faculty, 1009 at the Pediatric, 358 at the Dentistry, 175 students at the Professional Education Direction, 49 at the faculty of Pharmacy, 71 at the Direction of Preventive Medicine, 117 ones study at the Direction of High Nursing Affair).

Today graduates of the institute are trained in the following directions of master's degree: obstetrics and gynecology, therapy (with its directions), otorhinolaryngology, cardiology, ophthalmology, infectious diseases (with its directions), dermatovenereology, neurology, general oncology, morphology, surgery (with its directions), instrumental and functional diagnostic methods (with its directions), neurosurgery, public health and public health services (with its directions), urology, narcology, traumatology and orthopedics, forensic medical examination, pediatrics (with its directions), pediatric surgery, pediatric anesthesiology and intensive care, children's cardiology and rheumatology, pediatric neurology, neonatology, sports medicine.

The clinic of the institute numbers 700 seats and equipped with modern diagnostic and treating instrumentations: MRT, MSCT, Scanning USI, Laparoscopic Center and others.

There are all opportunities to carry out sophisticated educational process and research work at the institute.

Faculties 
There are four faculties at the Andijon State Medical Institute: the therapeutic Faculty, the Pediatric Faculty ,the dentistry and the Raising Qualifications of Physicians Faculty. All are related to the medical sciences and have their own departments.

Curative Works Faculty 
The Curative Works Faculty is the oldest operating faculty at the Institute. It was opened in October 1955, the year of ASMI's founding. During its first years of action, there were 10 departments and about 120 students at the faculty. In 1957, interest in the faculty grew rapidly among applicants. Under docent M.G Mirzakarim (dean from 1957 to 1970), the faculty reached its prominence, and it had one of the biggest base of textbooks in Uzbekistan.

From 2013, the dean of the Curative Works Faculty has been Adham Anvarovich Gofurov, a docent and doctor of medical sciences. Students study in the branches: curative works, medical pedagogics and higher education nursing. Enrollment is approximately 1740 students. There are 14 departments at the Curative Works Faculty, which are mainly located inside the ASMI campus and clinic. These departments are:
Traumatology, orthopedics, neurosurgery and injuries medicine 
Hospital therapy, endocrinology and hematology 
Hospital surgery and stomatology 
Languages, pedagogics and psychology 
Military training
Physical education and curative physical education
Normal physiology, bioorganic chemistry, biochemistry
Anatomy
Inner illnesses
Surgery
First training of general physicians 
Second training of general physicians
6–7 courses genecology  
6–7 course surgery, urology and first aid

Pediatric Faculty 
The Pediatric Faculty was opened at ASMI in 1977, and focuses on training pediatric specialists. (There was an earlier Pediatric Faculty at Central Asian Medical Pediatric Institute in Tashkent, operating from 1966 to 1972.) Currently there are 14 departments at the faculty which are mainly located inside the campus and its clinics; other departments are located in hospitals of the Andijan region. The faculty consists of 253 professors and teachers, in the following fourteen departments:
Social-humanitarian subjects
Medical biology, histology, medical and biological physics, informatics, medical technology and new techniques 
Pediatric surgery
Illnesses and epidemiology 
Clinic radiology, oncology
Pharmacology and clinic pharmacology 
Psychiatry, and clinical psychology, neurology and kid's neurology
Ophthalmology
Kids illnesses, neonatology and urgent pediatrics 
Pediatrics
Hospital and clinic pediatrics
Microbiology, immunology
General and social hygiene, control of the medical system
Anatomy

Raising Qualifications of Physicians Faculty 
This faculty mainly focuses on giving practical knowledge to doctors of the Fergana, Andijan and Namangan regions, updating their skills with new techniques and practices, developing specializations, and working toward a second degree. It was established on 6 July 1984 by edict number 864 of Uzbekistan's Public Health Ministry. The Faculty cooperates with "Tashkent Institution of Raising doctor's qualification" and with the Tashkent Medical Academy. Studies are held according to a plan from the Public Health Ministry. There are seven departments which give the following specific lessons (with training hours per academic year):
Therapy – 6580 hours per year
Pediatrics – 5938 hours per year
Neonatology – 3770 hours per year
Surgery – 3965 hours per year
Genecology – 3570 hours per year
Ophthalmology – 3770 hours per year
First aid – 2530 hours per year

Only doctors who have worked in their related field for at least three years can apply to the Faculty, where they can continue their studies and scientific researches.

Dormitory 
From the first years of ASMI's establishment, there was a dormitory for the students located in a student-town. Between 1960 and 1961, two 400-student dormitories were built. In 1964, a new dormitory was built, able to hold about 400 more people. After this occasion, additional construction began; in 1974, the Institute had built a dormitory for 630 students. In 1986, students town gained a new building for 230 students. In 2000, ASMI opened new building for the Social-Humanitarian Sciences department which was able to house 400 students. After creation of 2 academic lyceums under the Institute, the students-town gained a new building for 200 students. Each dormitory at the students-town has its own kitchen, rest rooms, study and computer rooms.

In 2010, Andijan city hosted the "Universiade – 2010" competitions which are held in Uzbekistan between the universities and institutions. Because of this, ASMI renovated the buildings in students-town, adding sports halls, small buildings, and living rooms. These complexes where then made available to the students.

Rectorate 
The rectorate of Andijan State Medical Institute consists of five representatives who share leading positions at the ASMI. Currently, the rector and head of the ASMI is Madazimov Madamin Muminovich, who is a doctor of medical sciences and professor. The vice-rectors on educational process is Abdulajanov B.R, who is a professor and doctor of medical sciences. The second  Vice-rector of the ASMI on scientific researches of the Institute is Salakhindinov Kamoldin Zuhritdinovich who is a professor and doctor of medical sciences. Last vice-rector of the Institute is Mamajonov Zafar Abdujalilovich.

Location 
Andijan State Medical Institute is located in Uzbekistan, Andijan region, Andijan city, Yu.Atabekova street, house 1.

See also 
Tashkent State Technical University
Tashkent Institute of Irrigation and Melioration
Tashkent Financial Institute
Moscow State University in Tashkent named M.V Lomonosov
Tashkent Automobile and Road Construction Institute

References

Links 
Information about the Institute in Uzbek oliygoh.uz checked 28 March 2016
Information about the institute in Uzbek checked 28 March 2016
Second web-site of the Institute checked 28 March 2016
Official article about the Institute in English checked 28 March 2016

Universities in Uzbekistan
Education in Uzbekistan
Educational organisations based in Uzbekistan
Andijan
Universities and institutes established in the Soviet Union
1955 establishments in the Soviet Union